was a Japanese kabuki performer. He was the progenitor of a family of kabuki actors from the Keihanshin region.  He was the son of a provincial doctor.  As a youth, he decided to join a troupe of actors; and this was the beginning of a long career.

Nakamura Utaemon was a stage name with significant cultural and historical connotations.

Life and career

In 1782, Utaemon presented the name Utaemon II to a favored apprentice; but the name was later retrieved (or  abandoned) in 1790. Then the name was bestowed on his son, who kept it. Utaemon III was the natural son of Nakamura Utaemon I.

In the conservative Kabuki world, stage names are passed from father to son in formal system which converts the kabuki stage name into a mark of accomplishment.

 Lineage of Utaemon stage names
 Nakamura Utaemon I (1714–1791) 
 Nakamura Utaemon II (1752-1798) 
 Nakamura Utaemon III (1778–1838) 
 Nakamura Utaemon IV (1798–1852) 
 Nakamura Utaemon V (1865–1940) 
 Nakamura Utaemon VI (1917–2001)

See also
 Shūmei

References

Bibliography
 Leiter, Samuel L. (2006).  Historical Dictionary of Japanese Traditional Theatre. Lanham, Maryland: Scarecrow Press. ;   OCLC 238637010
 __. ( 2002).  A Kabuki Reader: History and Performance. ; ;  OCLC 182632867
 Nussbaum, Louis Frédéric and Käthe Roth. (2005). Japan Encyclopedia. Cambridge: Harvard University Press. ; OCLC 48943301
 Scott, Adolphe Clarence. (1955). The Kabuki Theatre of Japan. London: Allen & Unwin.  OCLC 622644114

Kabuki actors
1714 births
1791 deaths
People from Ishikawa Prefecture
Actors from Ishikawa Prefecture
People from Kanazawa, Ishikawa